Garcinia hanburyi is a plant species in the genus Garcinia, native to Indochina; it is one of the gamboge producing trees.

Cytotoxic xanthonoids (gambogin, morellin dimethyl acetal, isomoreollin B, moreollic acid, gambogenic acid, gambogenin, isogambogenin, desoxygambogenin, gambogenin dimethyl acetal, gambogellic acid, gambogic acid, isomorellin, morellic acid, desoxymorellin, hanburin) and isomorellinol can be isolated from the dry latex of G. hanburyi.

References

 Garcinia hanburyi on www.worldagroforestry.org

hanburyi
Plants described in 1875
Plant dyes
Taxa named by Joseph Dalton Hooker